, commonly known as Toyo Tires, is a tire and rubber products company based in Itami, Japan.

History
The company started in 1945. In 1966, the company expanded to the United States as Toyo Tire USA Corporation. In 1999, Nitto Tire North America was established.

Timeline

Lines of business

Manufacturing and marketing of car tires, industrial rubber and synthetic resin products, soft and rigid polyurethane products, waterproof sheets, anti-vibration rubber for automotive parts, seat cushions, and sporting goods.

Tire brands 
 Toyo
 Nitto
 Silverstone

Sponsorship
Toyo has sponsored off-road Trophy Truck drivers including Robby Gordon, Kyle LeDuc, BJ Baldwin, Tavo Vildósola, Gus Vildósola, Andy McMillin and Bryce Menzies. As well as rally and stunt driver Ken Block.

Meanwhile, Nitto has sponsored the King of the Hammers rock crawling race, and drifting drivers Vaughn Gittin (since 2013), Chelsea DeNofa (since 2017), Ryan Tuerck (since 2019), Fredric Aasbø (since 2020), and Adam LZ (since 2021).

The company has also sponsored the Ultimate Fighting Championship mixed martial arts promotion from 2006 to 2008 and later since 2011.

Gallery

References

External links
 Toyo Tires Global 

Tire manufacturers of Japan
Conglomerate companies of Japan
Manufacturing companies based in Osaka
Japanese companies established in 1945
Conglomerate companies established in 1945
Automotive companies established in 1945
Companies listed on the Osaka Exchange
Companies listed on the Tokyo Stock Exchange
Japanese brands
Midori-kai